Abez is a rural locality (a settlement) in Inta District, Komi Republic, Russia. The population was 478 as of 2010. There are 11 streets.

From 1932 to 1959 there was the Abez camp, where many eminent people were imprisoned and died.

Geography 
The settlement is located on the right bank of the Usa River, 205 km northeast of Inta (the district's administrative centre) by road. Fion is the nearest rural locality.

Died in the camp 
Lev Karsavin, a philosopher and historian.
Hryhoriy Lakota, a Ukrainian priest.
Der Nister, a Yiddish writer.

References 

Rural localities in the Komi Republic